George Watson Hand (b Hill Ridware 6 March 1750–d City of London 3 February 1802) was Archdeacon of Dorset from 1780 to 1801.

Hand was educated at Christ Church, Oxford, where he matriculated in 1767, graduating B.A. in 1771, and M.A. in 1774.  His first post was as Chaplain to Thomas Newton, Bishop of Bristol. He held livings at St George Botolph Lane and St Giles-without-Cripplegate. He was a Prebendary of St Paul's and Salisbury.

Notes

1750 births
People from Rugeley
Alumni of Christ Church, Oxford
Archdeacons of Dorset
1802 deaths
Clergy from Staffordshire